István Lévai (born July 23, 1957) is a former boxer from Hungary, who won the bronze medal in the Heavyweight division (91 kg) at the 1980 Summer Olympics in Moscow. There he was defeated in the semifinals by titleholder Teófilo Stevenson of Cuba.

Amateur career
Lévai was a nine-time Hungarian amateur champion.

Olympic Results
1980 Olympic Results - Boxed as a heavyweight

Round of 16: bye
Quarterfinals: Defeated Anders Eklund (Sweden) by majority decision, 4–1 
Semifinals: Lost to Teófilo Stevenson (Cuba) by unanimous decision, 0–5 (was awarded bronze medal)

Boxing coach
Lévai is currently the trainer of IBO super welterweight champion Attila Kovács.

References

External links
monokli.hu: Lévai István: Jó lenne megint 25 évesnek lenni! 
Profile on databasesports.com

1957 births
Living people
Olympic boxers of Hungary
Heavyweight boxers
Boxers at the 1980 Summer Olympics
Olympic bronze medalists for Hungary
Olympic medalists in boxing
Hungarian male boxers
Medalists at the 1980 Summer Olympics
20th-century Hungarian people